Eiichi (written: 暎一, 栄一, 英一, 詠一 or 映一) is a masculine Japanese given name. Notable people with the name include:

, Japanese manga artist
, Japanese computer scientist
Eiichi Itai (born 1951), Japanese golfer
, Japanese sumo wrestler
, Japanese sport wrestler
, Japanese actor
, Japanese baseball player
, Japanese film director
, Japanese photographer
, Japanese photographer
, Japanese karateka and judoka
, Japanese chemist and academic
, Japanese field hockey player
, Japanese politician
, Japanese chemist
, Japanese musician
, Japanese photographer
, Japanese politician
, Japanese businessman
, Japanese economist and academic
, Japanese Nordic combined skier
, Japanese footballer
, Japanese film director and screenwriter
, Japanese politician

Japanese masculine given names